Eva Gudumac (born 6 May 1941) is a Moldovan specialist in pediatric surgery and politician. Full member of Moldova Academy of Sciences, member of Parliament of Moldova in 2001–2009, recipient of the Order of the Republic.

External links
 www.cnaa.acad.md/news/2011/06052011/

1941 births
Living people
Moldovan pediatric surgeons
Party of Communists of the Republic of Moldova politicians
Moldovan female MPs
Moldovan MPs 2001–2005
Moldovan MPs 2005–2009
Titular members of the Academy of Sciences of Moldova
21st-century Moldovan women politicians